Bzenec is a town in Hodonín District in the South Moravian Region of the Czech Republic. It has about 4,300 inhabitants.

Geography
Larger part of the municipal territory lies in a flat landscape of the Lower Morava Valley. The town is situated on the Syrovinka stream.

History

The first written mention of Bzenec is from 1015, when the local Businc Castle was conquered by Duke Oldřich. In around 1230, Bzenec became a regional centre. In 1330, Bzenec was first referred to as a town. First Jews settled here probably in the second half of the 14th century. The Jewish community belonged to the oldest in Moravia.

The original castle on the hill above the town was badly damaged during the Hussite Wars and demolished in the late 15th century. A new late Gothic fortress was built right in the town. In the 16th century, it was rebuilt into a Renaissance castle. Until 1514, the Bzenec estate was owned by the royal chamber, although it was often pawned.

The first reliable mentions of the Jewish community date back to the 16th century. The Jews were permitted to own vineyards, which, together with the town's convenient location on the trade route, were the reasons why they settled here. In 1605, the town was severely damaged by the army of Stephen Bocskai. Bzenec further suffered during the Thirty Years' War. The Jewish community was completely destroyed. The town recovered only slowly.

When the estate was owned by Count Erdmann Kryštof Pruskovský of Pruskov, the castle was baroque rebuilt by design of Domenico Martinelli in 1709–1710. The castle garden was rebuilt partly into a French formal garden and partly into an English park. In 1852, Count Vilém of Reichenbach had demolished the Baroque castle and had built a new neo-Gothic castle in 1855–1858. As a result, the count became very indebted, which eventually led to his suicide, and the second floor of the castle remained unfinished.

Demographics

Economy
Bzenec is known for viticulture and wine production. The town also has a tradition of growing fruit and vegetables. Pickled cucumbers and vegetable salads are mainly produced here.

Bzenec is also known for the vinegar production. The vinegar plant was founded here in 1864.

Sights

The castle fell into disrepair and today is owned by the town. It is inaccessible. The castle park is open to the public. In the park is a tree known as Bzenec Linden, which is supposedly more than 900 years old.

The landmark of the town is the Chapel of Saints Florian and Sebastian. It was built in 1703 on the hill above the town, on the site where the old castle stood. Due to its location, the chapel was struck several times by lightning, then it was destroyed during the World War II. The chapel was restored only recently, and was opened in 2018.

Notable people
Rudolf Auspitz (1837–1906), Austrian industrialist, economist; lived here
Nehemiah Brüll (1843–1891), rabbi; lived here
Max Kurzweil (1867–1916), Austrian painter, graphic artist
Norbert Jokl (1877–1942), Austrian linguist, father of Albanology

Twin towns – sister cities

Bzenec is twinned with:
 Egeln, Germany
 Mûrs-Erigné, France

References

External links

Populated places in Hodonín District
Cities and towns in the Czech Republic
Moravian Slovakia
Jewish communities in the Czech Republic
Shtetls